La Reprise is a French novel in the Nouveau roman style by Alain Robbe-Grillet published in 2001 by Les Éditions de Minuit.

References

2001 French novels
Novels by Alain Robbe-Grillet